Kyron Lynch (born 8 August 1981) is a Trinidadian cricketer. He played in five first-class matches for Trinidad and Tobago in 2005.

See also
 List of Trinidadian representative cricketers

References

External links
 

1981 births
Living people
Trinidad and Tobago cricketers